Ehsanullah or more correctly Ihsanullah is a male Muslim given name, composed of the elements Ihsan and Allah. It may refer to:

Ehsanullah (Guantanamo detainee 523), released May 9, 2003

See also
Ehsanullah Ehsan (disambiguation)

Arabic masculine given names